Akropolis IF is a Swedish football club formed by Greek immigrants in 1968 in Spånga.

The club is named after the Acropolis of Athens, and the Parthenon is depicted on its badge.

Background
Akropolis IF is a sports club which was founded in Stockholm in the spring of 1968. Basketball started in the autumn 1968 followed by football in the spring of 1969. Youth activities commenced in 1975.

The club formerly had close affiliations, since terminated, with other Stockholm football clubs such as AIK and BP .

In 1987, Akropolis advanced for the first time to Division 3. In 2006, the club made it to the second division, where they have stayed since. In 2012, Akropolis was relegated to Division 2, where they stayed until 2013 when they were once again promoted.
In 2014, Akropolis was promoted from Division 2 to Division 1 again. As newcomers in Division 1, Akropolis secured qualifiers to Superettan in their second last game against IFK Luleå.

Season to season

Attendances

In recent seasons Akropolis IF have had the following average attendances:

Current squad

Staff

Footnotes

External links
Akropolis IF

Association football clubs established in 1968
Football clubs in Stockholm
1968 establishments in Sweden
Diaspora football clubs in Sweden